Terence de Vere White (29 April 1912 – 17 June 1994) was an Irish lawyer, writer and editor.

Life

Career
Born in Dublin, de Vere White studied at Trinity College, Dublin where he qualified as a solicitor.  He later became a partner in a leading Dublin law firm.  He gave up law when he became the literary editor of The Irish Times, a post he held from 1961 to 1977.  He retired from the newspaper in 1977.

He wrote twelve novels, five biographies, two volumes of short stories and five other books of general interest.

Personal life
de Vere White married Mary O'Farrell in 1941 and they had two sons and a daughter.  He was also the father of Dervla Murphy's daughter, born in 1968.

At the time of his death, he was married to Victoria Glendinning.

Selected works

 The Road of Excess (1945)
 Kevin O'Higgins (1948)
 The Story of the Royal Dublin Society (1955)
 A Fretful Midge (1957)
 An Affair With the Moon  (1959)
 Prenez Garde (1961)
 The Remainder Man (1963)
 Tara (1967)
 The Parents of Oscar Wilde: Sir William and Lady Wilde (1967)
 Leinster (1968)
 Ireland (1968)
 The Lambert Mile, a New Novel (1969)
 The Lambert Revels (1969)
 The March Hare (1970)
 The Minister for Justice (1971)
 Mr. Stephen (1971)
 The Anglo-Irish (1972)
 After Sunset (1973)
 The Distance and the Dark (1973)
 The Radish Memoirs (1974)
 The Real Charlotte (1975)
 Chimes at Midnight and Other Stories (1977)
 Tom Moore: a Biography of the Irish Poet (1977)
 My Name is Norval (1979)
 Lucifer Falling (1980)
 Birds of Prey: Stories (1980)
 Johnnie Cross: a Novel (1983)
 Chat Show: a Novel (1987)

Sources

1912 births
Lawyers from Dublin (city)
Writers from Dublin (city)
Irish editors
20th-century Irish lawyers
1994 deaths